Ali Amiri (born 23 October 1987) is an Algerian footballer who plays as a midfielder for MCB Oued Sly.

References

External links

1987 births
Living people
Association football midfielders
Algerian footballers
RC Arbaâ players
CR Belouizdad players
USM Blida players
USM Bel Abbès players
US Biskra players
RC Relizane players
WA Tlemcen players
21st-century Algerian people